Mark "The Animal" Mendoza (born Mark Glickman, July 13, 1956) is an American rock bassist and a member of the heavy metal band Twisted Sister. He joined the band in 1978 after leaving the Dictators. He briefly played in Blackfoot in the early 1990s and with Leslie West projects. He is also a co-founder of Area 22 Productions where he hosts his weekly podcast 22 NOW.

Mendoza played the bass guitar on all of Twisted Sister's major label releases. He remixed Under the Blade when it was reissued by Atlantic Records, and produced and mixed Still Hungry and A Twisted Christmas.

Growing up in West Hempstead, New York, Mark 'Mendoza' Glickman attended George Washington Middle School and West Hempstead High School and graduated in 1974.

References 

1956 births
Living people
American heavy metal bass guitarists
American male bass guitarists
American male writers
Jewish American musicians
People from West Hempstead, New York
Twisted Sister members
Jewish heavy metal musicians
Jews in punk rock
Blackfoot (band) members
20th-century American bass guitarists
The Dictators members
20th-century American male musicians
21st-century American Jews